Antun "Toni" Pogačnik (6 January 1913 – 21 May 1978) was a Croatian footballer who played for both Yugoslavia and Croatia. He is notable for being a manager of Indonesia between 1954 and 1963 and is considered one of the best in the history of the Indonesian national football team.

Playing career

Club
Pogačnik started his football career in SAŠK Sarajevo in 1931. In 1934 he was transferred to Građanski Zagreb and then in 1938 to Concordia Zagreb where he ended his club career.

International
Pogačnik played two matches for Yugoslavia, one against Turkey (3–1) and the other against Romania (2–1). Both matches were played in Belgrade. He also played one match for the Independent State of Croatia, a World War II-era puppet state of Nazi Germany. against Nazi Germany in Vienna on 15 June 1941 (1–5).

Managerial career 
Pogačnik led arguably the most successful Indonesian national team. Under him, Indonesia held the Soviet Union to a 0–0 draw in the 1956 Melbourne Olympics quarter final game before losing 0–4 in the replay two days later. It was a strong Soviet team captained by the great Lev Yashin which then went on to win the gold medal.

As the Dutch East Indies, Indonesia competed in the 1938 World Cup but since then has not appeared in a world tournament at a senior level. Antun Pogačnik is the only coach who has been able to take the Indonesian national team to the Olympic Games. He is remembered very fondly in Indonesian football circles.
 He later became a manager, with Metalac Zagreb, FK Partizan, Grasshopper Club Zürich.

Honours

Player
Građanski Zagreb
 Kingdom of Yugoslavia Championship: 1936–37
 Kingdom of Yugoslavia Cup: 1937-38
 Zagreb Subassociation Cup: 1934-35, 1935–36

Manager
Indonesia
 Asian Games Bronze Medal: 1958

References

External links

 Profile at Serbian federation site

1913 births
1978 deaths
Sportspeople from Livno
Croats of Bosnia and Herzegovina
Association football defenders
Croatian footballers
Croatia international footballers
Yugoslav footballers
Yugoslavia international footballers
Dual internationalists (football)
NK SAŠK Napredak players
HŠK Građanski Zagreb players
HŠK Concordia players
Bosnia and Herzegovina football managers
Croatian football managers
Yugoslav football managers
FK Partizan managers
Indonesia national football team managers
Grasshopper Club Zürich managers
Yugoslav expatriate football managers
Expatriate football managers in Switzerland
Yugoslav expatriate sportspeople in Switzerland
Expatriate football managers in Indonesia
Yugoslav expatriate sportspeople in Indonesia